Roman de Rou is a verse chronicle by Wace in Norman covering the history of the Dukes of Normandy from the time of Rollo of Normandy to the battle of Tinchebray in 1106. It is a national epic of Normandy.

Following the success of his Roman de Brut which recounted the history of the Britons, Wace was apparently commissioned by Henry II of England to write a similar account of the origins of the Normans and their conquest of England. Wace abandons his tale before bringing it up to date, telling the reader in the final lines of Part III that the king had entrusted the same task to a Maistre Beneeit (believed to be Benoît de Sainte-More).

The work was started in the year 1160, and Wace seems to have performed his last revisions in the mid-1170s.

Composition
The work consists of:
 a 315-line account of the Dukes in reverse chronological order known as the Chronique Ascendante. This is believed by some scholars not to be an original part of the Rou, but a separate work by Wace.
 a 4,425-line section in alexandrines known as Part II
 an 11,440-line section in octosyllables known as Part III

A 750-line section known as Le Romaunz de Rou et des dus de Normendie appended in some editions appears to be an early draft, abandoned and later reworked into the final redaction.

Sources
Wace used as sources for his history of the Dukes of Normandy:
Gesta Normannorum Ducum
De moribus et actis primorum Normanniae ducum by Dudo of Saint-Quentin
Gesta Guillelmi by William of Poitiers
Gesta regum Anglorum by William of Malmesbury
Brevis relatio de Guillelmo nobilissimo comtie Normannorum
oral tradition, including information from his father, and his own eyewitness

See also
Anglo-Norman literature

References

External links
 
 

Anglo-Norman literature
Epic poems
Jersey culture
Norman chronicles